Susan Isaacs (born December 7, 1943) is an American novelist, essayist, and screenwriter. She adapted her debut novel into the film Compromising Positions.

Early life, family and education
She was born in Brooklyn, New York, to Helen Asher Isaacs, a homemaker, and Morton Isaacs, an electrical engineer. At Queens College, she majored in English and minored in economics. After college, she worked as a senior editor at Seventeen magazine and also as a freelance political speechwriter. She is Jewish.

She married Elkan Abramowitz, a lawyer, in 1968. She left work in 1970 to stay at home with her newborn son. Three years later, in 1973, she gave birth to her daughter.

She freelanced during this time, writing both speeches and magazine articles. She now lives on Long Island with her husband.

Career
Her first novel (and first attempt at fiction), Compromising Positions, was published in 1978. It was chosen as a main selection of the Book of the Month Club and, like all of her subsequent novels, was a New York Times bestseller. Her fiction has been translated into thirty different languages all over the world. She has also written a work of cultural criticism, Brave Dames and Wimpettes: What Women are Really Doing on Page and Screen.

In addition to writing books and screenplays, Isaacs has reviewed fiction and nonfiction for The New York Times, the Los Angeles Times, The Washington Post, and Newsday. She belongs to the National Book Critics Circle. Isaacs has written about politics, including a series of essays on the 2000 presidential campaign for Newsday. She has also authored op-eds and articles on feminism, film, and First Amendment issues.

In 1985, Isaacs adapted her own novel for the screenplay of the Paramount film Compromising Positions, which starred Susan Sarandon and Raul Julia. She wrote and co-produced Touchstone Pictures' Hello Again, a 1987 comedy starring Shelley Long, Gabriel Byrne, and Judith Ivey. Two more of her novels have been filmed. Shining Through, from 20th Century Fox, came out in 1992; it starred Michael Douglas and Melanie Griffith. After All These Years was produced for the Hallmark Channel in 2013 and starred Wendie Malick.  Isaacs is active in the literary community. She serves as a chairman on the board of Poets & Writers and, is a past president of the Mystery Writers of America. She belongs to The Creative Coalition, PEN, the International Association of Crime Writers, the American Society of Journalists and Authors, and the Adams Round Table. She is a trustee of the Jewish Theological Seminary, as well as trustee emerita of the Queens College Foundation. Isaacs has also worked for Long Island organizations including the Walt Whitman Birthplace Association, the North Shore Child and Family Guidance Association, and the Nassau County Coalition Against Domestic Violence.

Works 
Compromising Positions (novel) (1978)
Close Relations (novel) (1980)
Almost Paradise (novel) (1984)
Shining Through (novel) (1988)
Magic Hour (novel) (1991)
After All These Years (novel) (1993)
Lily White (novel) (1996)
Red, White and Blue (novel) (1998)
Brave Dames and Wimpettes: What Women are Really Doing on Page and Screen (nonfiction) (1999)
Long Time No See (novel) (2001)
Any Place I Hang My Hat (novel) (2004)
Past Perfect (novel) (2007)
As Husbands Go (novel) (2010)
 Goldberg Variations (novel) (2012)
 A Hint of Strangeness (novella) (2015)

Filmography
 Compromising Positions (novel, screenplay) (1985)
 Hello Again (screenplay, co-producer, actor) (1987)
 Shining Through (novel) (1992)
 After All These Years (novel) (2013)

References

External links 

 
 

1943 births
Living people
20th-century American novelists
21st-century American novelists
American women novelists
Screenwriters from New York (state)
Writers from Brooklyn
People from Nassau County, New York
Queens College, City University of New York alumni
American women screenwriters
20th-century American women writers
21st-century American women writers
Jewish American writers
Jewish women writers
Novelists from New York (state)
21st-century American Jews